Arturo Squinobal (born 16 November 1944) is an Italian mountain climber, mountain guide  of Monte Rosa and ski mountaineer from Gressoney-Saint-Jean. He is also director of the skiing school in his hometown.

Together with his brothers Oreste and Lorenzo, he placed first in the mountain guides team category in the 1975 Trofeo Mezzalama edition, which was carried out as the first World Championship of Skimountaineering. Together with Lorenzo and Danilo Barell he also won the 1978 Trofeo Mezzalama in the same category.

Together with his brother Oreste he made he first winter ascent of the South Face of Matterhorn (23 December 1971), the first winter ascent of the Peuterey Integral (26 December 1972, together with Yannick Seigneur, Michel Feuillarade, Marc Galy, and Louis Audoubert), and the first winter ascent of the West Face of Matterhorn (11 January 1978, together with Rolando Albertini, Marco Barmasse, Innocenzo Menabreaz, Leo Pession, Augusto Tamone).

Oreste and Arturo Squinobal's story is told in "Brothers of the Mountains".

References

1944 births
Alpine guides
Italian male ski mountaineers
Italian mountain climbers
Living people
People from Gressoney-Saint-Jean
World ski mountaineering champions
Sportspeople from Aosta Valley